William or Bill Hastings may refer to:

William Hastings, 1st Baron Hastings (ca. 1431–1483), English nobleman, close friend and Lord Chamberlain to King Edward IV, 1461-1483
William C. Hastings (1921–2010), Chief Justice of the Nebraska Supreme Court 
William Soden Hastings (1798–1842), U.S. politician from Massachusetts (Whig)
William Wirt Hastings (1866–1938), U.S. politician from Oklahoma (Democrat)
William Granville Hastings (1868–1902), American sculptor born in England
William Hastings-Bass, 17th Earl of Huntingdon (born 1948), English peer and racehorse trainer
Bill Hastings (footballer) (1888–?), English football player
Bill Hastings (judge) (born 1957), Canadian-born jurist who served as New Zealand's chief censor (1999–2010), then District Court Judge, Court Martial Judge, and Chief Justice of Kiribati.

See also
Hastings (name)